Wright Block is a property in Grand Forks, North Dakota that was listed on the National Register of Historic Places in 1982.

Also known as Neil's Block, it was built in 1909. It includes Early Commercial architecture style.

When listed the property included just the one contributing building.

Along with Clifford Annex, the Telephone Co. Building, the Dinnie Block, and Golden Square, the Wright Block was one of many "commercial vernacular brick buildings with classical revival details" that were built during a major building boom, with high quality brickwork.

The listing is described in its NRHP nomination document.

References

Commercial buildings on the National Register of Historic Places in North Dakota
Buildings designated early commercial in the National Register of Historic Places
Commercial buildings completed in 1909
National Register of Historic Places in Grand Forks, North Dakota
1909 establishments in North Dakota